Domingo Pillado (25 January 1928 – 5 February 2018) was a Chilean footballer.  He competed in the men's tournament at the 1952 Summer Olympics.

References

External links
 

1928 births
2018 deaths
Chilean footballers
Chile international footballers
Olympic footballers of Chile
Footballers at the 1952 Summer Olympics
Place of birth missing
Association football forwards
Naval de Talcahuano footballers